Mikel J. Harry  (born: December 28, 1951; died: April 15, 2017) was a statistician, quality expert, and author who is credited for developing Six Sigma, along with Bill Smith. Harry was sometimes referred to as the 'father of Six Sigma'. One of his books, Six Sigma: The Breakthrough Management Strategy Revolutionizing the World’s Top Corporations (published by Crown Business, 2000) has been on the bestseller list of The Wall Street Journal, Bloomberg Businessweek and Amazon.com.

At the age of 65, he died on 25 April 2017, in Chandler, Arizona.

Bibliography

Books

Awards and recognition 
Mikel J. Harry received the lifetime Engineering Excellence Award from Arizona State University in 2002. He was inducted into the "Who's Who" Registry of Global Business Leaders in 1993.

Death 
He died on April 25, 2017.

See also

 Six Sigma
 Bob Galvin
 Bill Smith (Motorola engineer)

References

External links 
  
 Quality conversation with Mikel Harry
 Executive Profile Mikel J. Harry
 Mikel J. Harry - Find A Grave

Motorola employees
1951 births
2017 deaths
Quality experts
Business writers
American writers
Six Sigma